The Rally Príncipe de Asturias is a rally motorsport competition usually held in September in Asturias, Spain, organized by the Automóvil Club Principado de Asturias (ACPA). In the early years, the championship was called Rally de la Ciudad de Oviedo.

The rally started in 1964, becoming the oldest and most popular car competition in Spain. In its first year, the entree fee was 800 pesetas and had a purse of 30,000 pesetas.

This competition is part of the Spanish Rally Championship, the Asturias Rally Championship and the European Rally Championship (western zone) with a maximum coefficient. On July 19, 2007, it was included in the 2008 calendar of the Intercontinental Rally Challenge and was repeated for two additional seasons.

The championship is split into the following segments:
 Tuesday and Wednesday: Registration and other administrative tasks
 Thursday: Shakedown, technical checks, and official ceremony.
 Friday and Saturday: The race, split into three stages. The two first are on Friday and the last on Saturday morning.

Although in April 2013 the Rally fell from the calendar due to a lack of institutional support and was later announced to be canceled, the organization managed to get the support of the board of the Cangas del Narcea and was able to re-establish the competition for the year.

On June 29, 2013 the first "Rally Fórmula Príncipe de Asturias" was held with the intention to raise funds for the rally. The event was held in the "Toño Fernández" circuit in the town of Cibuyo, in Cangas del Narcea, and on the 14th, 15th, and 16 September 50th anniversary was celebrated. The winner of the race was Luis Monzón (Mini John Cooper Works WRC), followed by Sergio Vallejo (Porsche 911) and Óscar Palacio (Porsche 911).

Champions

References

External links 

 Official site of the Rally Príncipe de Asturias
 Information page

Rally competitions in Spain
Events in Asturias
Sport in Asturias